Alcidion unicolor is a species of longhorn beetles of the subfamily Lamiinae. It was described by Fisher in 1932, and is known from Haiti.

References

Beetles described in 1932
Alcidion